Pablo César Galdón (born 28 November 1985) is an Argentine professional tennis player. His favorite surface is clay.

Career

Galdón enjoyed much success on ITF Futures circuit. Unfortunately, he struggled to make an impact at higher levels.

He never progressed further than the QF stage at any ATP Challenger event,having reached this stage on multiple occasions:

1) 2010, Cali, Colombia l. Juan Sebastián Cabal 3-6 4-6

2) 2010, Asunción, Paraguay l.  Nikola Ćirić 3-6 4-6

3) 2011, São José do Rio Preto, Brazil l. Thiago Alves 6-4 3-6 4-6

4) 2011, Guayaquil, Ecuador l.Pedro Sousa 6-0 5-7 6-7

5) 2012, Oberstaufen, Germany l. Guillaume Rufin 3-6 6-1 6-7

6) 2013, San Juan, Argentina l. Diego Schwartzman 3-6 0-6

His sole ATP main draw appearance came in Buenos Aires, Argentina in 2011, fighting through three qualifying rounds against Adrian Ungur, Facundo Bagnis and Giovanni Lapentti. He finally fell to then world number 13 Nicolás Almagro 1-6 2-6.

ATP tournaments finals

Titles (9)

Runner-Up (4)

Notes

References

External links
 
 

Argentine male tennis players
People from San Jerónimo Department
1985 births
Living people
Sportspeople from Santa Fe Province
21st-century Argentine people